Esther Wood (born 1866, died 1952/3) was a British art critic.

Born Esther Walker, Wood trained as a journalist.  She was an early member of both the Fabian Society and the Independent Labour Party, and also joined the Pharos Club.  She married J.W. Wood in 1893, and then followed him in joining the Social Democratic Federation. In 1902/03, she served on the executive of the Fabian Society.

In Dante Rossetti and the Pre-Raphaelite Movement (1894), Wood argues that the Pre-Raphaelites reinvented a mediaeval tradition.  She also edited the works of George Eliot, and wrote numerous articles for magazines, principally on subjects relating to art. She shared a house in Witley, Surrey with a fellow writer and Fabian, Gertrude Dix. She divorced J.W. Wood in 1897.

Esther Wood died in 1952 or 1953.

References

Bibliography 

1866 births
Year of death missing
English art critics
Members of the Fabian Society
Social Democratic Federation members